Nazir Ahmad Chohan is a Pakistani politician who was a member of the Provincial Assembly of the Punjab from August 2018 to May 2022.

Political career

He was elected to the Provincial Assembly of the Punjab as a candidate of Pakistan Tehreek-e-Insaf from Constituency PP-167 (Lahore-XXIV) in 2018 Pakistani general election. He de-seated due to vote against party policy for Chief Minister of Punjab election on 16 April 2022.

On 5 June 2022, the PML-N awarded a party ticket to him and he joined PML-N.

On 3 August 2022 Chohan, his son and six others were taken into judicial remand by the Lahore Police.

References

Living people
Pakistan Tehreek-e-Insaf MPAs (Punjab)
Year of birth missing (living people)